Methanoculleus submarinus is a methanogen. It is non-motile and highly irregular coccoid-shaped (with average diameter of 0.8-2 μm). Nankai-1 is its type strain.

References

Further reading

External links
LPSN

Type strain of Methanoculleus submarinus at BacDive -  the Bacterial Diversity Metadatabase

Euryarchaeota
Archaea described in 2003